William Michael Bulger (born February 2, 1934) is an American former Democratic politician, lawyer, and educator from South Boston, Massachusetts. His eighteen-year tenure as President of the Massachusetts Senate is the longest in history. He then became president of the University of Massachusetts.

Bulger came from Old Harbor Village Housing Development (now more commonly known as the Mary Ellen McCormick Housing Development). He graduated from Boston College High School in 1952, then from Boston College in Classics, then from Boston College Law School.

Despite his brother's infamy as the convicted mob boss James "Whitey" Bulger, who led the Winter Hill Gang, investigators have never uncovered any evidence that the two brothers colluded.  In 2003 he testified in a congressional hearing about communications he had with his then-fugitive brother. Due to the negative publicity, he was forced to resign from the presidency of the University of Massachusetts.  Bulger went on to teach as a visiting scholar at Suffolk University, but has since removed himself from public life.

Bulger is now retired and lives in South Boston's City Point section.

Early life 
William Bulger's father, James Joseph Bulger Sr., was from Harbour Grace, Newfoundland. After settling in Everett, Massachusetts, James Sr. married Jane Veronica "Jean" McCarthy, a first-generation Irish immigrant. William Bulger was born in Dorchester, Massachusetts, and is the third of six children in the family, and younger brother of former mob boss James Joseph "Whitey" Bulger Jr. (1929–2018).

Bulger's father worked as a union laborer and occasional longshoreman; he lost his arm in an industrial accident and the family was reduced to poverty. In May 1938, when Bulger was four years old, the family moved to South Boston's Old Harbor Village housing project, soon after it opened. He grew up there and has maintained lifelong friendships with many of those who were his former neighbors, including best friend, Korean War Marine P.O.W. and Purple Heart recipient Fred L. Toomey. The late Congressman Joe Moakley (1927–2001) was also a close childhood neighbor. Although the Bulger family was poor, William matriculated into Boston College High School. He enrolled at Boston College in 1952, but his undergraduate career was interrupted when he joined the United States Army. He served from September 1953 to November 1955, then returned to Boston College, completing his undergraduate degree in English Literature with the help of the G.I. Bill. He attended Boston College Law School, from which he received his Doctor of Jurisprudence degree in 1961. He is also the recipient of over 20 honorary degrees from a variety of academic institutions.

Political career 
Bulger became interested in politics in 1959 and was first elected to the Massachusetts House of Representatives as a Democrat in 1960. After serving five terms, Bulger was elected to the Massachusetts State Senate in 1970 representing the First Suffolk District. In 1973 he was named Second Assistant Floor Majority Leader. After Joseph DiCarlo's conviction for extortion in 1977, Bulger succeeded him as Senate Majority Leader. Bulger was elected President of the Massachusetts State Senate in 1978 and was re-elected every two years to 1996, making his time as State Senate president the longest tenure in Massachusetts history.

Like other Massachusetts politicians who were elected leaders of their legislative chambers, Bulger was frequently pilloried in the media, but remained very popular in his district. He won his district election every two years from 1961 to 1994 without ever facing a challenge more serious than he faced in the Democratic primary in 1988, when Stephen Holt, a neophyte liberal activist and bookstore owner from Dorchester won 31 out of 60 precincts, only to lose the district by a landslide due to the huge turnout of Bulger supporters in South Boston.

For many years, Bulger hosted the annual St. Patrick's Day Breakfast in South Boston. This is a "roast" of politicians.

Political milestones 

Bulger was a leading opponent of the desegregation of Boston schools achieved through desegregation busing. During one protest he called the police who were arresting protestors to desegregation "the gestapo".

During the 1960s, he led efforts to write the first child abuse reporting laws in the state. He was supportive of environmental protection legislation.

Bulger was among the first advocates of charter schools and public school choice. During the 1980s, he advocated funding of public libraries, the expansion of childhood nutrition services and fuel assistance programs. As Senate president, Bulger led the debate on welfare reform in the early 1990s, with the resulting legislation becoming the model for a national law.

President of the University of Massachusetts system 
Bulger was appointed president of the University of Massachusetts by the board of trustees on November 28, 1995. His candidacy for the UMass position was supported by Governor William Weld. The appointment was controversial in academic circles, as Bulger had no prior experience in higher education, and lacked the academic doctoral degree usually required for the presidency of a major state university system.

On August 6, 2003, Bulger announced that he would resign as president of the system effective September 1, 2003. His resignation came due to pressure from Governor Mitt Romney after Bulger had refused to cooperate with authorities who were searching for Bulger's brother, the notorious mobster James "Whitey" Bulger.

Extortion investigation 
In 1989, a close associate of Bulger, Thomas Finnerty, was accused of extorting $500,000 from a real estate developer, Harold Brown. Bulger received $240,000 of the payment. Both men maintained that it was a loan from Brown. However, after an investigation by U.S. Attorney Jeremiah O'Sullivan, no charges against Bulger were pressed claiming that the evidence was not sufficient to prove a crime.

Controversy over brother 
Bulger's older brother James "Whitey" Bulger Jr. was a convicted crime boss and multiple murderer and the former boss of the Winter Hill Gang. Whitey was a fugitive from 1995 until his arrest in June 2011.

In 1999, Whitey's longtime aide, Kevin Weeks, pleaded guilty to a number of charges related to Whitey's crime spree and became a cooperating witness.  Weeks revealed that in 1995, William talked to Whitey during an arranged phone conversation just two weeks after Whitey fled a pending racketeering indictment. When William testified before a grand jury in 2001, a federal prosecutor pressed him without success for information on his brother: So just to be clear, you felt more loyalty to your brother than you did to the people of the Commonwealth of Massachusetts? I never thought about it that way, Bulger replied. But I do have an honest loyalty to my brother, and I care about him (…) It’s my hope that I'm never helpful to anyone against him (…) I don't have an obligation to help everyone catch him. When asked why he didn't urge Whitey to turn himself in, William replied that he didn't feel it was in his brother's best interest to give himself up at the time.

After portions of Bulger's testimony were published in The Boston Globe,  he testified to a Congressional committee about the incident on June 19, 2003, after being granted immunity from prosecution for obstruction of justice.  Bulger revealed that he went to an arranged location in 1995 to take a call from his fugitive brother, apparently to avoid electronic eavesdropping.  He claimed that not notifying authorities about the call was "in no way inconsistent with my devotion to my own responsibilities, my public responsibilities" as state senate president.

During the hearing, when asked what he thought James (Whitey) did for a living, William Bulger said:

I had the feeling that he was in the business of gaming and ... whatever. It was vague to me but I didn't think, for a long while he had some jobs but ultimately it was clear that he was not being, you know, he wasn't doing what I'd like him to do.

He added that he loved his brother and hoped that the most brutal rumors concerning him would be proven false.

Bulger came under harsh criticism for his apparent evasiveness, and Governor Mitt Romney, among others, demanded his resignation as president of the University of Massachusetts.  Under pressure from all quarters, Bulger resigned in the fall of 2003.

Bulger also testified that the FBI never asked if he knew of Whitey's location. Those remarks were disputed by a former FBI agent who claimed Bulger declined to submit to an interview with the FBI. Months later, the committee report found Bulger's testimony "inconsistent" about whether the FBI had contacted him in its search for his fugitive brother.

Upon Whitey's arrest in California in June 2011, William Bulger issued a statement expressing his "sympathies to the families hurt" in the case, and asking for privacy for his family.

Active retirement and family 
Bulger is a past president of the Boston Public Library and past member of the board of trustees. He is also overseer emeritus of the Boston Symphony Orchestra. In addition, he is a former member of the Massachusetts General Hospital board of trustees, Museum of Fine Arts board of trustees, and McLean Hospital board of trustees.  He joined the faculties of Boston College and Suffolk University as a lecturer of political science in 2004. Bulger lived in South Boston with Mary Foley (1935–2020), his wife whom he married in 1960 until her death on June 7, 2020. Bulger and his wife have nine children and 33 grandchildren. According to the Massachusetts Open Checkbook list of state pensions, Bulger's pension from Massachusetts for his position as University of Massachusetts president ranged from $198,926 to $201,266 for the years 2011 to 2019.

See also
 Massachusetts House of Representatives' 5th Suffolk district
 1961–1962 Massachusetts legislature
 1963–1964 Massachusetts legislature
 1965–1966 Massachusetts legislature
 1967–1968 Massachusetts legislature
 1969–1970 Massachusetts legislature
 1971–1972 Massachusetts legislature
 1973–1974 Massachusetts legislature
 1975–1976 Massachusetts legislature
 1977–1978 Massachusetts legislature
 1979–1980 Massachusetts legislature
 1981–1982 Massachusetts legislature
 1983–1984 Massachusetts legislature
 1985–1986 Massachusetts legislature
 1987–1988 Massachusetts legislature
 1989–1990 Massachusetts legislature
 1991–1992 Massachusetts legislature
 1993–1994 Massachusetts legislature
 1995–1996 Massachusetts legislature

Biographical works 
 Bulger, William M. While the Music Lasts: My Life in Politics.  New York: Houghton Mifflin, 1996. .
 Bulger, William M. James Michael Curley: A Short Biography with Personal Reminiscences by William M. Bulger. Beverly, Massachusetts: Commonwealth Editions, 2009. .
 Burke, John J. A Profile in Political Power, a 2010 documentary produced by JAMAR Productions, highlights the political career of William M. Bulger.

References

External links 
 Gitell, Seth.  "Bulger's Denouement." Boston Phoenix December 12, 2002. Accessed September 11, 2006.
 Billy Bulger
 60 Minutes segment about Bulger, aired in 1992
 A Profile in Political Power
 

1934 births
Living people
American people of Irish descent
American political bosses
Boston College faculty
Boston College High School alumni
Boston College Law School alumni
Morrissey College of Arts & Sciences alumni
Democratic Party Massachusetts state senators
Politicians from Boston
Presidents of the Massachusetts Senate
University of Massachusetts Amherst alumni
United States Army soldiers
Military personnel from Massachusetts
Presidents of the University of Massachusetts system
Suffolk University faculty
Lawyers from Boston
People from South Boston
Writers from Boston
Massachusetts General Hospital people
McLean Hospital people